The 2008 Lyne by-election was held for the Australian House of Representatives seat of Lyne on 6 September 2008. This was triggered by the resignation of National Party MP Mark Vaile. The by-election was held on the same day as the Mayo by-election, and the Western Australian state election.

The writ for the by-election was issued on 4 August, with the rolls closing on 8 August. Candidate nominations closed 14 August. The by-election was contested on the same boundaries drawn for Lyne at the 2007 federal election. At that election, the National Party won the seat over the Labor Party by a two-party preferred margin of 58.58% to 41.42%.

The election was won by independent candidate Rob Oakeshott.

Background

Vaile first won the seat of Lyne at the 1993 election for the Nationals in a very close contest with the Liberal candidate. In ministerial positions since 1997, he became leader of the National Party and thus Deputy Prime Minister in the Howard government from 2005. At the 2007 federal election, the opposition Labor Party defeated the incumbent Liberal-National coalition government. This marked the first change of government in over 11 years. Following the coalition election defeat, Vaile announced on 19 July 2008 his intention to resign his seat, to take effect on 30 July 2008. This followed Peter McGauran in Gippsland and former Foreign Minister Alexander Downer in Mayo.

Candidates

Neither the Labor Party nor the Liberal Party stood a candidate.

Results
Oakeshott obtained a majority of votes in every polling booth, with the exception of Dyers Crossing, receiving about two-thirds of the primary vote and three-quarters of the two-candidate vote.

Mark Vaile resigned.

See also
 List of Australian federal by-elections

References

External links
 

2008 elections in Australia
New South Wales federal by-elections